Rhyzodiastes suturalis is a species of ground beetle in the subfamily Rhysodinae. It was described by R.T. & J.R. Bell in 1985. Its type locality is Sooretama in Espírito Santo, southeastern Brazil. Rhyzodiastes suturalis measure  in length.

References

Rhyzodiastes
Beetles of South America
Insects of Brazil
Endemic fauna of Brazil
Beetles described in 1985